The men's 10 km competition of the open water swimming events at the 2011 Summer Universiade was held on August 13 of that year.

Medalists

Results

References 
Start List

2011 Summer Universiade events